Harvey J. Graff (born 1949) is a comparative social historian as well as a professor of English and History at Ohio State University. His writings on the history of literacy have been published in eight countries and he is acknowledged internationally for his contributions to urban studies and urban history. Some of his more notable works include two books entitled The Literacy Myth and Conflicting Paths: Growing Up in America.

Career 

Harvey J. Graff received the Bachelor of Arts degree from Northwestern University in 1970 followed by Master of Arts from The University of Toronto in 1971, and finally his Doctor of Philosophy, also from The University of Toronto in 1975.

Before coming to his current residence at Ohio State University in 2004, Graff taught at the University of Texas at Dallas from 1975 to 1998 and the University of Texas at San Antonio from 1998 to 2004. He was a strong proponent of quantitative social science methods in history. He was elected the president of the Social Science History Association (1999-2000). In his presidential address Graff argued that traditional historians had successfully counterattacked against quantification and the innovations of the "new social history": 
The case against the new mixed and confused a lengthy list of ingredients, including the following: history’s supposed loss of identity and humanity in the stain of social science, the fear of subordinating quality to quantity, conceptual and technical fallacies, violation of the literary character and biographical base of “good” history (rhetorical and aesthetic concern), loss of audiences, derogation of history rooted in “great men” and “great events,” trivialization in general, a hodge-podge of ideological objections from all directions, and a fear that new historians were reaping research funds that might otherwise come to their detractors. To defenders of history as they knew it, the discipline was in crisis, and the pursuit of the new was a major cause.

Books

The Literacy Myth

Written in 1979, this book studies 19th century educators who supported the "literacy myth", as Graff calls it, which is the assumption that literacy translates to economic, social, and cultural success. Graff suggests that this myth views literacy as a necessity for success, and a means to an economic, social, or political end. His research contradicts this, suggesting “that connections between schooling and social mobility are not natural ones". He goes on to say that reality contradicts inborn assumptions correlating literacy and success.

Conflicting Paths: Growing Up in America

The assumption has been made by scholars and the general populace alike “that children have followed in the paths marked out for them by adults, and the possibility that they developed their own reactions and behavior in the course of their maturation has been ignored”. Basically, while social scientists are familiar with normative behavior, little is known about the actual behavior of children as they mature. Conflicting Paths looks at over five-hundred narratives dating from 1750 to 1920 to try and follow the actual process of growing up in America and, if it has, how it has changed over time as well as the effects of factors such as class, gender and ethnicity.

Undisciplining Knowledge: Interdisciplinarity in the Twentieth Century

Published by Johns Hopkins University Press in 2015. According to the description provided in Google Books: "Interdisciplinarity — or the interrelationships among distinct fields, disciplines, or branches of knowledge in pursuit of new answers to pressing problems — is one of the most contested topics in higher education today. Some see it as a way to break down the silos of academic departments and foster creative interchange, while others view it as a destructive force that will diminish academic quality and destroy the university as we know it... Graff presents readers with the first comparative and critical history of interdisciplinary initiatives in the modern university. Arranged chronologically, the book tells the engaging story of how various academic fields both embraced and fought off efforts to share knowledge with other scholars. It is a story of myths, exaggerations, and misunderstandings, on all sides."

Awards 

In 2001 he was presented the Doctor of Philosophy honoris causa by the University of Linköping in Sweden for his contributions to scholarship.
Graff has also received awards from the American Antiquarian Society, American Council of Learned Societies, Central Mortgage and Housing Corporation, National Endowment for the Humanities, National Science Foundation, The Newberry Library, Spencer Foundation, Swedish Institute, Texas Committee for the Humanities, and the Woodrow Wilson Foundation.

References

External links
Harvey J Graff at Ohio State University
MIsunderstanding Wikipedia, 2022 article by Graff in Inside Higher Ed

Ohio State University faculty
Social historians
1949 births
Living people